Letcher County Central High School (LCCHS) is a public high school containing grades 9-12 in the southeastern city Ermine of Letcher County, Kentucky, United States, about 15 miles from the Virginia border. The school opened in 2005 with its first graduating class in 2006. This is now the only high school in the district because it was built to combine all high schools of the district into one. However, it is not the only public high school in Letcher County, as the city of Jenkins and its immediate area are served by a separate school district that did not participate in the consolidation. LCCHS was rated bronze in the "US News Best High Schools" rankings.

In 2012 LCCHS offered its 930 students Advanced Placement courses, 16 athletic teams, vocational courses, a Speech Team, a Pep and Marching Band with a Color Guard, JROTC, programs for office workers and peer tutors, and other extracurricular activities and clubs. The school's band and JROTC traveled to participate in the second inauguration of President Barack Obama in 2013. The volleyball team has been to state tournament several times, the wrestling team has had multiple regional championships, and the girls' basketball team has several sweet sixteen appearances. In the 2011–2012 school year the cheerleaders placed second State-At-Large and were 14th Region Champions, the boys' soccer team were District Champions, the Cross Country team made District and Region Champions, the varsity boys' team won 13th in State, and the Lady Cougar Basketball team were 53rd District Champions.

History
Letcher County Central High School was opened in 2005. The school was built to consolidate the three schools of the district: Fleming-Neon High School, Whitesburg High School, and Letcher High School. In early 2012, the new Letcher County Area Technology Center was opened on the same property as Letcher County Central. This $9.5 million building is used by students of Letcher County Central and Jenkins Middle High School.

Enrollment
According to the 09-2010 school year, of Letcher Central's 952 students, 1% were of a minority and 63% were total economically disadvantaged. 0.2% of the student body were considered American Indian/Alaskan Native, 1% Black, 0.1% Hispanic, and 98% white. 52% of the student body were male, and 48% female.

Programs
LCC offers Advanced Placement (AP) courses and dual credit classes through local colleges to earn college credit and demonstrate success at college-level coursework. LCCHS also provides vocational classes at the Letcher Co. Area Technology Building to provide the students with technical education training. The school also offers programs for students who want to be office workers and peer tutors.

Extracurricular activities

Athletics
Letcher Central provides 16 sport teams including the single sex teams. These include tennis, baseball, volleyball, boys and girls soccer, football, cross country, golf, cheerleading, dance, wrestling, girls and boys basketball, archery, track & field, and softball.

Band and color guard
Letcher Central's band is a marching and a pep band. The color guard and band had more than 50 student members in 2011–2012. The band and color guard had the opportunity to play at the 57th Presidential Inaugural Parade for President Obama. Competing with more than 2,800 applicants to perform during the parade following the president's inauguration, Letcher County Central marching band was one of 24 groups chosen for this opportunity. The band was also joined by the school's ROTC Cadet Honor Guard performing a "Patriotic Parade Sequence," after President Barack Obama and Vice President Joe Biden were sworn into office. The marching band was also invited to perform at the Kentucky Society of Washington DC's Inaugural Ball on January 19, 2013. The program has grown from 50 kids to approximately 400 kids in just six years. The band has received numerous awards such as a Kennedy Center Honorable Mention, and has participated in prominent parades such as the Gubernatorial Parades in Kentucky in 2007 and 2011 and a special parade at Disney World in 2012.

Speech team
As of 2012 the Letcher Central speech team had been participating in the regional and state competitions for three years. In those years, the team increased in size and in honors received. In 2012 the school had its first state finalist in Humorous Interpretation.

Other extracurricular activities and clubs
Letcher Central also provides an academic team, choir, Student Government, Foundations of Education club, yearbook staff, and a Drama department that hosts annual shows to the public.

References

2005 establishments in Kentucky
Buildings and structures in Letcher County, Kentucky
Education in Letcher County, Kentucky
Educational institutions established in 2005
Public high schools in Kentucky